Nizhegorodsky District is the name of several districts in Russia.

Districts of the federal subjects

Nizhegorodsky District, Moscow, a district in South-Eastern Administrative Okrug of the federal city of Moscow

City divisions
Nizhegorodsky City District, Nizhny Novgorod, a city district of Nizhny Novgorod, the administrative center of Nizhny Novgorod Oblast

See also
Nizhegorodsky (disambiguation)

References